Massimo Cartasegna (30 June 1885 – 15 April 1964) was an Italian athlete who competed at the 1908 Summer Olympics in London.

Biography
He was born in Turin. The first event was the 1500 metres, in which Cartasegna did not finish his first round semifinal heat and did not advance to the final.

In the 400 metres event, Cartasegna placed second in his preliminary heat with a time of 52.7 seconds, behind Louis Sebert's 50.2 seconds and did not advance to the semifinals. In the 3200 metre steeplechase competition he was eliminated in the first round. He was also a member of the Italian team which was eliminated in the first round of the 3 mile team race.

National titles
He won 5 national championships.
 Italian Athletics Championships
 1000 metres: 1907, 1909
 1200 metres steeplechase: 1908, 1909, 1911

References

Sources

External links
 profile

1885 births
1964 deaths
Italian male middle-distance runners
Italian male steeplechase runners
Olympic athletes of Italy
Athletes (track and field) at the 1908 Summer Olympics